This list contains all cultural property of national significance (class A) in the canton of Valais from the 2009 Swiss Inventory of Cultural Property of National and Regional Significance. It is sorted by municipality and contains 58 individual buildings, 16 collections, 15 archaeological finds and 2 other, special sites or objects.

The geographic coordinates provided are in the Swiss coordinate system as given in the Inventory.

Albinen

Anniviers

Bellwald

Bettmeralp

Binn

Bitsch

Blatten

Bourg-Saint-Pierre

Brig-Glis

Bürchen

Chamoson

Conthey

Crans-Montana

Eischoll

Eisten

Ernen

Evionnaz

Evolène

Ferden

Finhaut

Fully

Goms

Grengiols

Guttet-Feschel

Hérémence

Isérables

Kippel

Lens

Leuk

Leukerbad

Liddes

Martigny

Martigny-Combe

Massongex

Mont-Noble

Naters

Niedergesteln

Noble-Contrée

Obergoms

Oberwald

Orsières

Raron

Riederalp

Saas-Balen

Saillon

Saint-Gingolph

Saint-Léonard

Saint-Luc

Saint-Maurice

Salvan

Sembrancher

Sierre

Simplon

Sion

Stalden

Törbel

Turtmann

Unterbäch

Val-d'Illiez

Val de Bagnes

Vernayaz

Vionnaz

Visp

Visperterminen

Vouvry

Zermatt

Zwischbergen

See also
 List of cultural property of regional significance in Switzerland: Valais

References
 All entries, addresses and coordinates are from:

External links
 Swiss Inventory of Cultural Property of National and Regional Significance, 2009 edition:

PDF documents: Class B objects
Geographic information system